Timothy Monckton Synnot DSC (15 January 1916 – 18 May 1997) was an officer in the Royal Australian Navy. He was a descendant of Monckton Synnot and the older brother of Admiral Anthony Synnot. Having joined the RAN in 1930, he served on HMAS Hobart in World War II, during which he was awarded the Distinguished Service Cross and was mentioned in Despatches (for "good services in operations off the coast of British Somaliland"). He was promoted to commander in 1951 and retired as a captain.

After his naval service Synnot settled at Naberoo, near Keith, in South Australia.

References

Record of Timothy Monckton Synnot at the National Archives of Australia 
Mention of Timothy Monckton Synnot's death

1916 births
1997 deaths
Royal Australian Navy personnel of World War II
Recipients of the Distinguished Service Cross (United Kingdom)
Royal Australian Navy officers